Campbell County School District #1 is a public school district based in Gillette, Wyoming, United States.

Geography
Campbell County School District #1 serves all of Campbell County. The district covers a geographic area of about 4,802 square miles (12,436 km) and includes the following communities:

Incorporated places
City of Gillette
Town of Wright
Census-designated places (Note: All census-designated places are unincorporated.)
Antelope Valley-Crestview
Sleepy Hollow
Unincorporated places
Recluse
Rozet
Weston

Schools

Secondary schools

 Campbell County High School
 Thunder Basin High School
 Westwood High School
 Wright Junior/Senior High School

Junior high schools
 Sage Valley Junior High School
 Twin Spruce Junior High School

Elementary schools

 4-J Elementary School
 Buffalo Ridge Elementary School
 Conestoga Elementary School
 Cottonwood Elementary School
 Hillcrest Elementary School
 Lakeview Elementary School
 Little Powder School
 Meadowlark Elementary School
 Paintbrush Elementary School
 Prairie Wind Elementary School
 Pronghorn Elementary School
 Rawhide Elementary School
 Recluse Elementary School
 Rozet Elementary School
 Stocktrail Elementary School
 Sunflower Elementary School
 Wagonwheel Elementary School
 Campbell County Virtual School

Virtual Schools

 Campbell County Virtual School

Facilities

Libraries
The Campbell County School District libraries have 266,869 books with each school having an average 13,343 books. Checkouts by students numbered 330,000 in 2018 with an average 16,517 checkouts per school. On average the books were 17 years old.

Administration
The superintendent as of 2019 is Alex Ayers, Ed.D.  The School Board consists of:
 Mrs. Toni Bell, Trustee
 Mrs. Linda Bricker, Trustee
 Dr. Ken Clouston, Trustee
 Mrs. Lisa Durgin, Vice-Chair
 Mr. David Foreman, Treasurer
 Dr. Joseph Lawrence, Clerk and Assistant Treasurer
 Mrs. Anne Ochs, Chair

Student demographics
The following figures are as of October 1, 2009.

Total District Enrollment: 8,214
Student enrollment by gender
Male: 4,314 (52.52%)
Female: 3,900 (47.48%)
Student enrollment by ethnicity
American Indian or Alaska Native: 124 (1.51%)
Asian: 68 (0.83%)
Black or African American: 70 (0.85%)
Hispanic or Latino: 693 (8.44%)
Native Hawaiian or Other Pacific Islander: 1 (0.01%)
White: 7,258 (88.36%)

See also
List of school districts in Wyoming

References

External links
Campbell County School District #1 - Official site.

School districts in Wyoming
Education in Campbell County, Wyoming
Gillette, Wyoming